The New Bern Historic District is a national historic district located at New Bern, Craven County, North Carolina.  the district contained 492 contributing structures with construction dates ranging from the early 1800s to the mid-20th century. The district contains notable examples of buildings in the Federal and Late Victorian styles.

It was listed on the National Register of Historic Places in 1973, with boundary expansions in 2003 and 2016.

See also
National Register of Historic Places listings in Craven County, North Carolina

References

Historic districts on the National Register of Historic Places in North Carolina
Federal architecture in North Carolina
Victorian architecture in North Carolina
Geography of Craven County, North Carolina
Buildings and structures in New Bern, North Carolina
National Register of Historic Places in Craven County, North Carolina